Kaljaja (Cyrillic: Каљаја) or Kalaja (Albanian) may refer to:

Kaljaja (Balovac) is an archaeological site located southeast of the village of Balovac, in municipality of Podujevo
Kaljaja (Teneš Do) is an archaeological site, which is located in Teneš Do, in municipality of Pristina
Kaljaja (Binačka) is a fortress located near village Podgrađe, near Gjilan
Kaljaja (Bistrička) is the medieval fortress in Prizren
Kalaja (Ulcinj)